Magicbricks, a division of Times Internet Limited, a wholly owned subsidiary of Bennett, Coleman & Co. Ltd (The Times Group) is a website that provides a common platform for property buyers & sellers to locate properties of interest in India, and source information about all property related issues.

Company initiatives
Magicbricks with IIM Bangalore launched the Housing Sentiment Index. In this collaboration of two leaders from Academia and Industry- the co-branded "MB-IIMB Housing Sentiment Index", is all set to capture the "buyer’s mood" on the real estate scenario in India.

Services
Apart from buying, selling & renting properties in India, users have access to the following services as well:

Buyer's Guide, a real estate eBook that covers all the essential steps and stages entailed in property buying and contains answers, quick tips, and expert advice on what to look for and how to manage property buying.

PropIndex is a tool by Magicbricks which empowers property seekers and investors with detailed information on the movement of residential apartment prices and supply of properties in India for some major cities & has been adding more cities on a regular basis as well.

News section of Magicbricks "Property Pulse"  includes property news, home loans concerns, legal & taxation issues, expert opinion and analysis of property trends.

MagicBricks mobile

MagicBricks also came up with an interface for mobile users to post their properties, upload property photos and videos, edit details, and refresh listings.

MagicBricks campaign
In March 2014, Magicbricks went live with an integrated campaign across all media (TV, Digital, Radio and several others mediums) to position itself as a property portal that helps users decide on the right kind of property.  The current campaign carries a tagline "Property Sahi Milegi Yahin".

Awards
Magicbricks.com has been awarded for serving a large pool of users through its portal and providing premium information to users to make informed decisions.

Major Awards –

See also
 Real estate
 Economy of India

References

External links
Official website

Companies of The Times Group
Indian real estate websites
Companies based in Noida
2006 establishments in Uttar Pradesh
Internet properties established in 2006